Elson is both a surname and a given name. Notable people with the name include:

Surname

 Andrea Elson (born 1969), actress
 Anita Elson (1898–1985), American dancer and singer
 Bob Elson (1904–1981), sportscaster
 David Elson, coach
 Diane Elson (born 1946), economist
 Edward L.R. Elson (1906–1993), minister
 Francisco Elson (born 1976), basketball player
 Jeremy Elson (born 1974), computer researcher
 Karen Elson (born 1979), model and singer
 Kate Elson (born 1979), model and filmmaker
 Kay Elson (born 1947), politician
 Peter Elson (Canadian politician) (1839–1913)
 Peter Elson (1947–1998), illustrator
 Pip Elson (born 1954), golfer
 Rachel Elson, journalist
 Rae Elson, activist
 Rebecca Elson (1960–1999), astronomer
 Richard Elson (born 1962), comic book artist
 Richard Mark Elson (born 1979), writer, director and editor
 Robert Elson, professor
 Roy Elson (born 1930), politician
 William Elson (disambiguation), footballer

Given name
 Élson Falcão da Silva (born 1981), football player
 Elson Becerra (1978–2006), football player
 Elson Floyd, educator
 Elson Moyo, deputy commander of the Air Force of Zimbabwe
 Elson Seale, soccer player
 Elson Soh (born 1988), artist
 Elson-Dudley House
 Ellison
 Ellyson

Places
Elson, a small settlement near Gosport, Hampshire, England 
Fort Elson

See also
 Nelson (disambiguation)